The Cornet Player Who Betrayed Ireland is a compilation of previously uncollected stories by Frank O'Connor from 1981. The stories were selected by O'Connor's widow, Harriet O'Donovan Sheehy, and the Cork writer David Marcus. The collection includes:

War
There is a Lone House
The Miracle (no relation to "The Miracle" from The Common Chord)
May Night
The Flowering Trees
The Storyteller
Mac's Masterpiece
The Climber
Hughie
Last Post
The Cornet Player Who Betrayed Ireland
Uncle Pat
The Adventuress
The Landlady
Baptismal
What Girls Are For
Adventure
A Case of Conscience
The Call
Ghosts
The Grip of the Geraghtys

References

1981 short story collections
Short story collections by Frank O'Connor
Works by Frank O'Connor
Books published posthumously